Jack Rogers may refer to:

Jack Rogers (English footballer) (1895–1977), English footballer
Jack Rogers (Australian footballer) (1913–1997), Australian rules footballer
Jack D. Rogers (1919–2002), American professor of business management at University of California, Berkeley
Jack Rogers (minister) (1934–2016), American theologian and Presbyterian moderator
Jack Rogers (politician) (born 1937), American politician in South Carolina
Jack Rogers (retailer), footwear retailer
Jack Rogers (UPS), American businessman
Jack Rogers (cricketer), English cricketer

See also
John Rogers (disambiguation)